Tom Erlandson (born June 19, 1966) is a former American football linebacker who played one season in the National Football League for the Buffalo Bills.  He played college football at the University of Washington and was drafted in the twelfth round of the 1988 NFL Draft.

College
Erlandson was a three-year letterman at linebacker for Washington from 1985 to 1987.

References

1966 births
Living people
American football linebackers
Washington Huskies football players
Buffalo Bills players
Players of American football from Denver